CartaCapital is a weekly Brazilian newsmagazine published in Santana do Parnaíba, São Paulo and João Pessoa, Paraíba and distributed throughout the country by Editora Confiança. The main focuses of the magazine are politics, economy, social issues and culture.

History
CartaCapital was created as a monthly magazine in 1994 by Mino Carta, an Italo-Brazilian journalist. In 1968, Carta founded Brazil's leading newsmagazine Veja alongside Victor Civita. Eight years later, he founded IstoÉ, another popular newsmagazine. Unsatisfied with the result of the magazines he helped to create, Carta founded CartaCapital as an alternative to these. CartaCapital is noted for its small crew; it only has eleven journalists.

The magazine was published on a monthly until 1996 when its frequency was switched to biweekly. Its frequency was changed to weekly in 2002. The magazine is known for supporting causes in a biased way, such as Luiz Inácio Lula da Silva's both candidatures, the legalization of abortion in all cases, the maintenance of the current age of criminal responsibility and the extradition of Cesare Battisti to Italy, among other polemic issues. Carta argues that the magazine does it to avoid hiding in a curtain of impartiality and not being honest to its readers.

CartaCapital is a declared left-wing publication but has in its staff Antonio Delfim Netto, Minister of Economy during the right-wing military dictatorship. Besides his participation in a right-wing government, Antonio Delfim Netto is a Keynesian.

The magazine openly supported Dilma Rousseff's government, although the article in which Mino Carta put and explained his position was later removed without notice.

CartaCapital also publishes an educational magazine titled Carta na Escola on a monthly basis. It is dedicated to teachers, advising them on how to discuss the news with their students.

Recent circulation history

Notable contributors

Márcio Alemão
Paulo Henrique Amorim
Nirlando Beirão
Wálter Fanganiello Maierovitch
Antônio Delfim Netto
José Onofre
Sócrates
Pedro Alexandre Sanches
Ana Paula Sousa
Drauzio Varella
Thomaz Wood Jr.
Maurício Dias
Jean Wyllys
Vladimir Safatle
Djamila Ribeiro

References

External links
CartaCapital official website
Carta na Escola official website

1994 establishments in Brazil
Biweekly magazines
Magazines published in Brazil
Business magazines
Magazines established in 1994
Mass media in São Paulo
Monthly magazines published in Brazil
News magazines published in South America
Portuguese-language magazines
Weekly magazines published in Brazil